Rudo Mhonderwa (born 9 September 1995) is a Zimbabwean long-distance runner. In 2019, she competed in the senior women's race at the 2019 IAAF World Cross Country Championships held in Aarhus, Denmark. She finished in 101st place.

In 2017, she competed in the senior women's race at the 2017 IAAF World Cross Country Championships held in Kampala, Uganda. She finished in 75th place.

References

External links 
 

Living people
1995 births
Place of birth missing (living people)
Zimbabwean female long-distance runners
Zimbabwean female cross country runners